Valerie Scott (born 21 April 1967 in Edinburgh) is a British former alpine skier who competed in the 1992 Winter Olympics.

References

1967 births
Living people
Sportspeople from Edinburgh
Scottish female alpine skiers
Olympic alpine skiers of Great Britain
Alpine skiers at the 1992 Winter Olympics